Sirry Steffen (born Sigríður Geirsdóttir, anglicised as Sigridur Geirsdottir; 29 May 1938 – 1 February 2020) was a former Miss Iceland who appeared in American television series and movies in the 1960s.  "Sirry Steffen" is her Americanized name used for film and television credits.

Pageant career
She won the Miss Iceland contest in 1959.  In August 1960, she competed against fifty-one other national winners in the very first Miss International contest, held at the Veteran's Memorial Coliseum in Long Beach, California.  She received the title Miss Photogenic, and finished as 2nd runner-up, behind 1st runner-up Miss India, and winner Miss Colombia (now the Philippines' prestigious Binibining Pilipinas national director Stella Márquez-Araneta).

Television career
Her best known role was as Mrs. Drysdale's maid Marie, in three 1962 episodes of The Beverly Hillbillies.

Her first television role was as Miss Iceland in the 1960 private-eye series Michael Shayne, starring Richard Denning, in the episode Death Selects the Winner, broadcast December 23, 1960.

She appeared as 'French Girl' in The Old Magic episode of The Tom Ewell Show, broadcast March 14, 1961.

Film career
Her first film role was a minor one in the 1962 film Hitler, starring Richard Basehart in the title role.

She had a major role in the 1963 horror film The Crawling Hand, as 'Marta Farnstrom', the Swedish exchange-student girlfriend of the young man possessed by 'The Crawling Hand'.

She had an uncredited role as 'Party Girl' in the 1964 film Bedtime Story, starring Marlon Brando and David Niven.

In 1982, she had a major role credited to her Icelandic name in the film Okkar á milli: Í hita og þunga dagsins (which, literally translates as Between us: In the heat and weight of the day), a change-of-pace film created by Iceland's famous Viking-film director Hrafn Gunnlaugsson about a man's mid-life crisis.

Personal life
Sigriður Geirsdóttir was born May 29, 1938, in Iceland.  After she competed in the Miss International competition in 1960, she traveled the world as part of the entourage representing the pageant.  She moved to California in the last few months of 1960 to embark on her television and film career, but moved back to Iceland in the mid-1960s.  She was married twice. Her first husband was Þorkell Valdimarsson, they divorced. Her second husband was Stefán Bjarnason. She re-entered the film world with her 1982 role in the Icelandic film mentioned above.  She lived for the rest of her life in Iceland.

References

External links
 

Icelandic television actresses
1938 births
2020 deaths
Icelandic film actresses
20th-century Icelandic actresses
Miss International 1960 delegates